Wyndham Hills is a community in York County, Pennsylvania, United States. One of the suburbs of York, Wyndham Hills, is located in Spring Garden Township on the hills of the same name. Among the other suburbs of York, Wyndham Hills is on the highest elevation.

References

York, Pennsylvania